Kru, KRU may refer to:
 Kanchanaburi Rajabhat University (KRU)
Kru people, ethnic group in Liberia and Côte d'Ivoire
Kru languages, the group of dialects spoken by the Kru of Liberia and Côte d'Ivoire
KRU, Malaysian boy band
KRU Interactive, a gaming company
Kru (fictional character), in the film Chang: A Drama of the Wilderness
 Korea Rugby Union
Kuzbassrazrezugol, a Russian coal-mining company.